Leah Frances Russell (28 March 1891 - May 1983) was an Australian opera singer.

References

1891 births
1983 deaths
20th-century Australian women opera singers